Stanley Lancelot Yates (6 June 1900 – 28 December 1980) was  a former Australian rules footballer who played with Collingwood and Richmond in the Victorian Football League (VFL).

Stan continued his football career at Northcote FC and finally as playing Captain Coach ad Fairfield FC, taking them to a premiership in 1926. Stan's nephew is Ken Turner, who played in Collingwood's 1958 Premiership team and Ken's son Jamie Turner was part of the 1990 Collingwood premiership team. Another nephew of Stan's is Graeme Yallop an Australian cricket captain.

Stan normally played as a ruckman, one of the original Collingwood 6 footers!

Notes

External links 

Stan Yates's profile at Collingwood Forever

1900 births
1980 deaths
Australian rules footballers from Bendigo
Collingwood Football Club players
Richmond Football Club players